The Society of Broadcast Engineers (SBE) is a professional organization for engineers in broadcast radio and television. The SBE also offers certification in various radio frequency and video and audio technology areas for its members.

Background
The organization was founded in 1964.

The society elected its first female president, Andrea Cummis, in 2021.

Certifications
Operator Level Certifications
 Certified Radio Operator (CRO)
 Certified Television Operator (CTO)

Broadcast Networking Certifications
 Certified Broadcast Networking Technologist (CBNT)
 Certified Broadcast Networking Engineer (CBNE)

Engineer Level Certifications
 Certified Broadcast Technologist (CBT)
 Certified Audio Engineer (CEA)
 Certified Video Engineer (CEV)
 Certified Broadcast Radio Engineer (CBRE)
 Certified Broadcast Television Engineer (CBTE)
 Certified Senior Broadcast Radio Engineer (CSRE)
 Certified Senior Broadcast Television Engineer (CSTE)
 Certified Professional Broadcast Engineer (CPBE)

Specialist Certifications
 Certified 8-VSB Specialist (8-VSB)
 Certified AM Directional Specialist (AMD)
 Certified Digital Radio Broadcast Specialist (DRB)

Previous Certifications

These certifications are still in use but are no longer issued.
 Certified Senior Broadcast Engineer (CSBE)
 Certified Radio and Television Broadcast Engineer (CBRTE)
 Certified Senior Radio and Television Broadcast Engineer (CSRTE)

See also
 List of post-nominal letters
 Broadcast engineering

References

External links
 SBE Official Website
 Society of Broadcast Engineers Hong Kong Chapter(SBE HK Chapter Official Website)

Broadcast engineering
Engineering societies based in the United States
Mass media companies established in 1975
Organizations established in 1975
Professional certification in engineering
Non-profit organizations based in Indianapolis
1975 establishments in the United States
Multinational mass media companies